Thomas Allen (born 20 November 1953) is an Irish former sports shooter. He competed in two events at the 1996 Summer Olympics.

References

External links
 

1953 births
Living people
Irish male sport shooters
Olympic shooters of Ireland
Shooters at the 1996 Summer Olympics
People from Omagh
Commonwealth Games medallists in shooting
Shooters at the 1994 Commonwealth Games
Commonwealth Games gold medallists for Northern Ireland
20th-century Irish people
Medallists at the 1994 Commonwealth Games